The Poetics of Space is a 1958 book about architecture by the French philosopher Gaston Bachelard. The book is considered an important work about art. Commentators have compared Bachelard's views to those of the philosopher Martin Heidegger.

Summary
Bachelard applies the method of phenomenology to architecture, basing his analysis not on purported origins (as was the trend in Enlightenment thinking about architecture) but on lived experience in architectural places and their contexts in nature. He focuses especially on the personal, emotional response to buildings both in life and in literary works, both in prose and in poetry. He is thus led to consider spatial types such as the attic, the cellar, drawers and the like. Bachelard implicitly urges architects to base their work on the experiences it will engender rather than on abstract rationales that may or may not affect viewers and users of architecture.

Bachelard also discusses psychoanalysis and the work of the psychiatrist Carl Jung. Comparing the psychoanalytic and phenomenological approaches to his subject matter, he sees merit in both, but finds the phenomenological approach preferable.

Publication history
The Poetics of Space was first published by Presses Universitaires de France in 1958. In 1964, the Orion Press, Inc. published the book, with a foreword by the philosopher Étienne Gilson, in an English translation by the writer Maria Jolas. Beacon Press republished the work in English in 1969. In 1994, it republished it in a new edition with an added foreword by the historian John R. Stilgoe. In 2014, Penguin Books published an edition with a foreword by the novelist Mark Z. Danielewski and an introduction by the philosopher Richard Kearney.

Reception
The Poetics of Space has influenced the philosophers Paul Ricœur and Edward S. Casey, and the critic Camille Paglia. Ricœur was influenced by Bachelard's understanding of the imagination. Casey identified The Poetics of Space as an influence on his work Getting Back into Place (1993). He wrote that Bachelard shared Heidegger's "emphasis on the importance of dwelling places." However, he added that neither Heidegger nor Bachelard "adequately assessed the role of the human body in the experience of significant places." Paglia identified The Poetics of Space as an influence on her work of literary criticism Sexual Personae (1990). She has commented of Bachelard's "dignified yet fluid phenomenological descriptive method" that it "seemed to me ideal for art", and described Bachelard as "the last modern French writer I took seriously."

Joan Ockman gave The Poetics of Space a positive review in Harvard Design Magazine. She compared Bachelard's views to Heidegger's, and wrote that, alongside works such as Heidegger's Being and Time (1927) and his essay "Building Dwelling Thinking", The Poetics of Space was a key text for the architect Christian Norberg-Schulz. She also compared Bachelard's views on epistemology to those of the philosopher Thomas Kuhn and described him as an influence on the philosopher Michel Foucault, finding it apparent in Foucault's The Archaeology of Knowledge (1969). Danielewski compared The Poetics of Space to the critic Harold Bloom's The Anxiety of Influence (1973), the essayist Lewis Hyde's The Gift: Imagination and the Erotic Life of Property (1983), Steve Erickson's novel Days Between Stations (1985), and Thomas Pynchon's novel Against the Day (2003).

Other authors who have praised The Poetics of Space include Gilson, Stilgoe, Kearney, and the philosopher Gary Gutting. Gilson credited Bachelard with making "one of the major modern contributions to the philosophy of art". Stilgoe praised his discussion of "the meaning of domestic space". Kearney described The Poetics of Space as "the most concise and consummate expression of Bachelard's philosophy of imagination." Gutting credited Bachelard with subtly explaining the meaning of archetypal images.

See also
 Aesthetics
 Phenomenology (architecture)
 Khôra

References

Bibliography
Books

 
 
 
 
 
 
 
 
 
 
 

Online articles

 

1958 non-fiction books
Architecture books
Books by Gaston Bachelard
French non-fiction books
Phenomenology literature
Presses Universitaires de France books